Miguel is a given name and surname, the Portuguese and Spanish form of the Hebrew name Michael. It may refer to:

Places
Pedro Miguel, a parish in the municipality of Horta and the island of Faial in the Azores Islands
São Miguel (disambiguation), various locations in Azores, Portugal, Brazil and Cape Verde

People
 Miguel (surname)

Arts, entertainment, and media
Miguel (singer) (born 1985), Miguel Jontel Pimentel, American recording artist
Miguel Bosé (born 1956), Spanish pop new wave musician and actor
Miguel Calderón (born 1971), artist and writer
Miguel Cancel (born 1968), former American singer
Miguel Córcega (1929–2008), Mexican actor and director
Miguel de Cervantes (1547–1616), Spanish author
Miguel Delibes (1920–2010), Spanish novelist
Miguel Ferrer (1955–2017), American actor
Miguel Galván (1957–2008), Mexican actor
Miguel Gómez (photographer) (born 1974), Colombian / American photographer.
Miguel Ángel Landa (born 1936), Venezuelan actor, stand-up comedian, and television personality
Miguel Mihura (1905–1977), Spanish absurdist playwright
Miguel Morayta (1907–2013), Spanish film director and screenwriter
Miguel Ríos (born 1944), Spanish singer and actor
Miguel Sandoval (born 1951),  American film and televisionactor

Politics
Miguel Boyer (1939–2014), Spanish politician
Miguel Brugueras (1939–2006), Cuban politician and diplomat
Miguel Díaz-Canel (born 1960), First Secretary of the Communist Party of Cuba since 2021
Miguel Hidalgo y Costilla (1753–1811), Mexican priest and revolutionary rebel leader
Miguel Malvar (1865–1911), Filipino revolutionary and president of the Philippines
Miguel Maura (1887–1971), Spanish politician
Miguel Portas (1958–2012), Portuguese politician

 Middle name
Juan Miguel Zubiri (born 1969), Filipino politician

Portuguese royalty
Miguel of Portugal (1802–1866), King of Portugal
Miguel, Duke of Braganza (1853–1927), Portuguese pretender, son of King Miguel I
Prince Miguel, Duke of Viseu (1878–1923), Portuguese prince, older son of Miguel II
Miguel da Paz (1498–1500), older son of King Manuel I of Portugal
Infante Miguel de Bragança (1699–1724), natural son of King Pedro II of Portugal
Miguel, Prince of Beira

Sports
Nigel Miguel (born 1963), Belizean/American actor, film producer, film commissioner, former basketball player
Miguel Andújar (born 1995), Dominican Republic professional baseball player
Miguel Cabrera (born 1983), Venezuelan professional baseball player
Miguel Comminges (born 1982), Guadeloupean footballer
Miguel Cotto (born 1980), Puerto Rican boxer
Miguel Duhamel (born 1968), Canadian motorcycle racer
Miguel González (pitcher) (born 1984), Mexican professional baseball player
 Miguel Hiraldo (born 2000), Dominican Republic professional baseball player
Miguel Induráin (born 1964), Spanish cyclist
Miguel Maia (born 1971), Portuguese beach volleyball player
Miguel Monteiro (born 1980), Portuguese footballer, known as "Miguel"
Miguel Montero (born 1983), Venezuelan-American former professional baseball player
Miguel Montes (footballer, born 1980) (born 1980), Salvadoran footballer
Miguel Ángel Niño (born 1968), Colombian road cyclist
Miguel Ponce (born 1971), Chilean footballer
Miguel Sanabria (born 1964), Paraguayan footballer
Miguel Ángel Sanabria (1967–2006), Colombian road cyclist
Miguel Sanó (born 1993), Dominican Republic professional baseball player
Miguel Tejada (born 1974), Dominican Republic former professional baseball player
Miguel Ubeto (born 1976), Venezuelan road cyclist
Miguel Veloso (born 1986), Portuguese footballer
Miguel Yajure (born 1998), Venezuelan professional baseball player

Others
Miguel Vicente de Abreu (1827–1883), Goan historian
Miguel de Icaza (born 1972), Mexican software developer and GNOME founder
Wanigamuni Miguel Mendes Wimalarathna (1823-1890), Sri Lankan Sinhala Buddhist orator
Miguel Patricio (born 1966/1967), Portuguese businessman
Miguel Rodríguez Orejuela (born 1943), cofounder of the Cali cartel
Miguel Sánchez (1594–1674), novohispanic priest, writer and theologician
Miguel de Unamuno (1864–1936), Spanish philosopher
Miguel Ángel Félix Gallardo (born 1946), Mexican drug lord

Arts, entertainment, and media

Fictional entities
Miguel, a character in the animated series Beyblade G Revolution
Miguel, a bullfighter in the fighting game Human Killing Machine
Miguel, a protagonist in the DreamWorks animated film The Road to El Dorado
Miguel, a character in the TV series The Walking Dead
Miguel Lopez-Fitzgerald, a regular character on the soap opera Passions
Miguel O'Hara, the Spider-Man of 2099
Miguel Cassidy, the youngest Cassidy child from Dino Ranch
Miguel Prado, a character played by Jimmy Smits during the third season of the TV series Dexter
Miguel Caballero Rojo, a character from the Tekken video game series
Miguel Diaz from Cobra Kai
Miguel Santos, Maya's brother in the PBS animated series Maya & Miguel
Don Miguel, a notorious 19th-century whale mentioned in Moby-Dick
Miguel Rivera, the protagonist in the Pixar animated film Coco
Miguel, a blue down-to-earth, active and energetic Anubis chihuahua from Rainbow Butterfly Unicorn Kitty

Other
Miguel Street, a semi-autobiographical novel by V. S. Naipaul, published in 1959
Miguel, music album by Dalida from 1957
Miguel (TV series), an Israeli drama television series

See also
Michel (disambiguation)
San Miguel (disambiguation)
Miguel Pérez (disambiguation)

Portuguese masculine given names
Spanish masculine given names